Law of the Range is a 1941 American Western film directed by Ray Taylor using a screenplay by Sherman L. Lowe which is based on a story by Charles E. Barnes. The film starred Johnny Mack Brown, Fuzzy Knight, Nell O'Day, and Riley Hill.

Cast
 Johnny Mack Brown as Steve Howard
 Fuzzy Knight as Chap Chaparral
 Nell O'Day as Mary O'Brien
 Riley Hill (credited as Roy Harris) as Wolverine Kid
 Janet Warren (credited as Elaine Morey) as Virginia O'Brien
 Pat O'Malley as Howard
 Hal Taliaferro as Tim O'Brien
 Charles King as Walt
 Ethan Laidlaw as Hobart
 Jack Rockwell as Sheriff Henderson
 Alan Bridge as Squint Jamison
 Jerome Harte as Kurt
 Terry Frost as Sam Emery

References

External links

1941 films
1941 Western (genre) films
American Western (genre) films
American black-and-white films
Films directed by Ray Taylor
1940s American films